Manasvi Mamgai is a former Miss India, model, and Bollywood actress. She resides at Los Angeles, California, USA along with her family.

Early life 
Manasvi was born in Delhi but grew up in Chandigarh. Her mother Prabha, is from Uttarakhand. By the age of 15, she had won almost 50 state and national awards in dancing, singing, and skating.

Beauty pageants and Modelling 
She won Elite Model Look India in 2006 and debuted at the India Fashion Week. She also won Miss Tourism International 2008. After winning Miss India 2010, she represented India at the Miss World beauty pageant, held in China in 2010. She was chosen as the top 8 in the Miss World Finale in 2010 in the Dances of the world. Since then she has walked the ramp for many top Indian designers and shot various campaigns. She has also shot for top Indian and International magazines like Vogue, Elle, Femina, Verve, Cosmopolitan, New face, Code of style, etc.

Film and TV 

Manasvi is an alumnus of Anupam Kher's acting school in Mumbai, Actor Prepares. In 2012 she was a part of the movement-based play LIMBO that received critical reviews. It was showcased in Prithvi theatre Mumbai and screened in Paris. The same year she appeared in the movie The world before her. 

In 2014 she played the antagonist, Marina opposite Ajay Devgn in the Eros international studio movie Action Jackson, directed by Prabhu Deva. Manasvi appeared on the famous Indian comedy show Comedy Nights with Kapil along with her Action Jackson star cast. In 2015 she was nominated for the Best Debutant award at Filmfare Awards where she was also a presenter. In 2020 she was lead of the 2 music videos, Yaadein by American R&B duo TheMxxnlight and Dum ba Dum by Daler Mehndi.

Manasvi currently lives in Los Angeles where she is pursuing a career in acting and producing. She recently was the winner of the American game show The Price is right.

RHC Ambassador 
In 2016, Manasvi, became the Indian Ambassador to the Republican Hindu Coalition.

Humanity against terrorism concert 
Manasvi put together the "Humanity United against Terror" a Bollywood Charity Concert which took place on 15 October 2016 at NJ Exposition center in Edison, New Jersey. The concert was addressed by President-Elect Donald Trump. She even performed in it with Bollywood celebrities including Malaika Arora Khan, Prabhu Deva, Sophie Choudry.

Presidential inauguration performance 
Manasvi along with Bollywood singing sensation Mika Singh, performed at Trump's pre-inaugural Welcome Celebrations held at Lincoln Memorial in Washington DC. She led over a dozen Indian dancers performing to some of the popular Bollywood numbers including the Oscar-winning "Jai Ho" of A R Rahman. The live event was played out in front of 800,000 people and was telecast to over 2 billion viewers worldwide. Manasvi attended a lot of the Inaugural functions including Trump's VIP Candle Light Dinner at Union Station.

Diwali celebrations at The Oval office 
Manasvi attended the first time celebration of Diwali at The Oval Office in the presence of President Donald Trump on 17 October 2017. Manasvi is very active in the RHC Immigration campaign to have equitable treatment of DALCA kids (300,000 legal childhood arrivals from India who lose their status at the age of 21) and reduce the Green Card backlog of hi-skilled legal immigrants based on merit.

References

Year of birth missing (living people)
Female models from Delhi
Actresses from New Delhi
Living people
Miss World 2010 delegates
Miss Tourism International delegates
Femina Miss India winners
Indian Hindus
Actresses in Hindi cinema